El Hadjar is a district in Annaba Province, Algeria. It was named after its capital, El Hadjar.

Municipalities
The district is further divided into 2 municipalities:
El Hadjar
Sidi Amar

Districts of Annaba Province